Victoria Suzanne Meadows is a Professor with the Astronomy Department and Director of the Astrobiology Program at the University of Washington. She is also the Principal Investigator for the NASA Astrobiology Institute’s Virtual Planetary Laboratory Lead Team and the chair of the NAI Focus Group on Habitability and Astronomical Biosignatures (HAB). The research direction of the team is to create computer models that can be used to understand planet formation, stability and orbital evolution, and to simulate the environment and spectra of planets that can potentially be habitable.

She obtained her B.Sc. in Physics from the University of New South Wales, and a Ph.D. in Physics from the Astrophysics Department of the University of Sydney.

Scientific American consulted her for comments when the Kepler mission discovered large numbers of planets orbiting distant stars.

Research

Meadows’ main research focus is to determine processes to identify whether an extrasolar planet is able to support life. With her Virtual Planetary Laboratory, she develops computer models to understand the process by which planets form, their stability and orbital evolution. The models are used to help design and develop planet detection missions.

, Google Scholar reports that her publications have a total of 9774 citations, with an h-index of 54.

In 2018, the SETI Institute awarded her their Drake Award "in recognition of her contributions to the field of astrobiology and her work as a researcher, leader and inspiration for everyone working in her field".

References

External links

Victoria Meadows' page at NASA Quest
Profile at Virtual Planetary Laboratory
YouTube interview
NASA Astrobiology Projects
Where Life Is: The Search for a Planet Like Ours

Year of birth missing (living people)
Living people
American women astronomers
Astrobiologists
University of Washington faculty
University of New South Wales alumni
University of Sydney alumni